John Bolitho (1930–2005) was born in Bude in Cornwall, and spent his working life in the Royal Navy, the theatre and television (including performances in the Black and White Minstrel Show, the Royal Variety Performance and the Billy Cotton Band Show), and business.

He was the Grand Bard of the Gorseth Kernow between 2000 and 2003 with the bardic name of "Jowan an Cleth". During this time he visited many Cornish bards in Australia and was made patron of the Cornish Association of Victoria. He also helped create the official website for Gorseth Kernow.

It is recorded that John Bolitho was the first man to speak Cornish at the European Parliament in Strasbourg.

He also served as a North Cornwall District councillor, a Bude-Stratton town councillor, and was Mebyon Kernow parliamentary candidate for North Cornwall.

References

1930 births
2005 deaths
People from Bude
Grand Bards of Gorsedh Kernow
Bards of Gorsedh Kernow
Cornish language
Cornish-speaking people
Cornish nationalists
Cornish Methodists
Politicians from Cornwall
Councillors in Cornwall
Mebyon Kernow politicians
20th-century English politicians
20th-century Methodists